Nenciulești is a commune in Teleorman County, Muntenia, Romania. It is composed of two villages, Nenciulești and Păru Rotund. These were part of Mavrodin Commune until 2003, when they were split off.

References

Communes in Teleorman County
Localities in Muntenia